Makgathatso Charlotte Chana Pilane-Majake (born 13 February 1957) is a politician and the former Deputy Minister of Public Service and Administration in South Africa.

See also

African Commission on Human and Peoples' Rights
Constitution of South Africa
History of the African National Congress
Politics in South Africa

References

1957 births
Living people
Government ministers of South Africa
African National Congress politicians
Members of the National Assembly of South Africa
Women members of the National Assembly of South Africa
21st-century South African women politicians
21st-century South African politicians